Michkov (Russian: Мичков) is a Russian masculine surname, its feminine counterpart is Michkova. The surname may refer to the following notable people:
Dmitri Michkov (born 1980), Russian football coach and former player
Matvei Michkov (born 2004), Russian ice hockey winger

Russian-language surnames